Nancy Hower is an American actress, director, screenwriter and producer.

Early life
 
Nancy Hower grew up in Wyckoff, New Jersey, and is one of nine children. She appeared onstage for the first time as a senior in high school. Upon graduating from high school, Hower continued her studies at the Juilliard School in New York City where she majored in drama. During her years at Juilliard, she appeared in such productions as King Lear, And A Nightingale Sang, Macbeth, The Fifth of July, and The Would-Be Gentleman. She also later appeared in two stage productions at the Williamstown Theatre Festival in Massachusetts.

Career
Hower began her professional acting career playing the role of Andrea in The Years at the Manhattan Theatre Club in 1993. She has also been in several on and off-Broadway stage productions throughout her career. In 1994, she made her film debut with a supporting role in the comedy film Insomnia. In 1998, she appeared in the airline disaster film Blackout Effect. Other film work includes a role in the short independent film Tunnel Vision (1998) and an FBI agent in the sci-fi movie The Last Man on Planet Earth (1999). Hower also had a role in Standing On Fishes (1999), and although her name appears in the end credits of this movie, her role was cut from the final version. She has had guest-starring roles in the television series Suddenly Susan and The Sentinel.

Star Trek: Voyager
Hower had a recurring role as Ensign Samantha Wildman on the popular sci-fi series Star Trek: Voyager. She appeared in eight episodes spanning the series' seven-year run. Her character in the series was named after a real life 7-year-old girl who died in an accident. The little girl's parents decided to donate their daughter's organs. The ailing wife of one of Voyager's writers received one of the girl's kidneys. The writer, Jimmy Diggs, decided to honor the child's memory by naming the Voyager persona after the little girl. Because the real Samantha Wildman had been fond of animals, Jimmy Diggs thus made Ensign Wildman head of Voyager's xenobiology department. During the events of the episode "Deadlock" (Season 2), she gives birth to a daughter: Naomi Wildman. For almost the entire series, Hower's character was the only crew member with a child aboard (until the final episode, "Endgame II", during which Lieutenant B'Elanna Torres delivers a daughter).

Hower's Voyager appearances are, in chronological order: "Elogium" (Season 2), "Tattoo" (Season 2), "Dreadnought" (Season 2), "Deadlock" (Season 2), "Basics, Pt. 2" (Season 3), "Mortal Coil" (Season 4), "Once Upon A Time" (Season 5), and "Fury" (Season 6).

Ensign Wildman was also mentioned, but not seen, in several other Voyager episodes.

Music
Hower formerly fronted two alternative rock bands, WENCH and STELLA. STELLA was the opening act on Meat Loaf's 2001 UK tour. She sang lead, played rhythm guitar, and wrote all of the band's music. Hower almost recorded an album with STELLA, but the band broke up before then. 

Hower also co-wrote the original music for the play Momma in 2001, as well as writing and recording an unreleased rock opera titled Girl On Mars. Also in 2001, she played the role of Yitzak in Hedwig and the Angry Inch in Los Angeles.

2003-present
Hower wrote and directed the short film The Wizard of Id, an unreleased film about a musician who discovers that he literally has the power to change the lives of the people around him through his music. The film reportedly starred Claire Forlani and Wallace Shawn. In 2003, Hower directed the stage play City Limits at the Keck Theater in Los Angeles.

Hower wrote, directed, produced and edited the independent film Memron (2004), a mockumentary on the Enron scandal which won many awards and high acclaim from audiences at several film festivals that year. In 2004, she also directed the stage play The Lights Change at the Keck Theatre.

Following the success of Memron, Hower teamed up with fellow Memron producers Robert Hickey, John Lehr, and Evie Peck to create a comedy improv series titled 10 Items or Less. The TBS show stars John Lehr as a less than successful businessman who takes over the family supermarket when his father dies. 10 Items or Less premiered on TBS on November 27, 2006.

Hower provided vocals for the film Catch and Release (2007), in which she also plays a small role.

In 2013, Hower directed and co-wrote the Hulu original series Quickdraw, which was renewed for a second season in 2014.

On January 12, 2023, Jamie Lynn Spears announced that production had begun on a sequel film entitled, Zoey 102, set to premiere in 2023 on Paramount+, with original series cast members Spears, Sean Flynn, Christopher Massey, Erin Sanders, Matthew Underwood, Jack Salvatore, Jr., and Abby Wilde reprising their roles. Production began in January 2023 in North Carolina. Hower is currently attached to direct, with  Spears attached as executive producer.

References

External links
 

20th-century American actresses
20th-century American singers
20th-century American women singers
21st-century American actresses
21st-century American singers
American women rock singers
American film actresses
Screenwriters from New Jersey
American stage actresses
American television actresses
American women film directors
American women screenwriters
Actresses from New Jersey
Juilliard School alumni
Living people
People from Wyckoff, New Jersey
Singers from New Jersey
American women television directors
American television directors
Film directors from New Jersey
21st-century American women singers
Year of birth missing (living people)